The Treaty of Montpellier (or the Peace of Montpellier) was signed in Montpellier on 18 October 1622 between King Louis XIII of France and Duke Henry II of Rohan. The treaty followed the siege of Montpellier and ended hostilities between French royalists and the Huguenots. Moreover, it confirmed the tenets of the Edict of Nantes, pardoned Henry II, and allowed the Huguenots to maintain their numerous forts and garrisons.

See also
List of treaties

External links
Louis XIII and Religion

1622 in France
1622 treaties
Montpellier
Montpellier
Huguenot rebellions
History of Occitania (administrative region)